Microbacterium koreense is a Gram-positive bacterium from the genus Microbacterium which has been isolated from seawater in Korea.

References

Further reading

External links
Type strain of Microbacterium koreense at BacDive -  the Bacterial Diversity Metadatabase	

Bacteria described in 2006
koreense